Erich Sautner (born 6 November 1991) is a German footballer who plays as a midfielder for FC 08 Villingen.

Career
After playing in SC Freiburg's youth and reserve teams, Sautner joined Hallescher FC on a season-long loan in July 2012, and made his debut in the club's first game in the 3. Liga, as a substitute for Michael Preuß in a 1–0 win over Kickers Offenbach. He returned to Freiburg at the end of the 2012–13 season before joining SV Waldhof Mannheim in September 2013. Four months later he joined TSG Neustrelitz, where he spent half a season, helping the club win the Regionalliga Nordost title but missing promotion due to a playoff defeat to Mainz 05 II. At the end of the season he signed for Eintracht Trier.

References

External links

1991 births
Living people
Association football midfielders
German footballers
3. Liga players
Freiburger FC players
SC Freiburg players
Hallescher FC players
SV Waldhof Mannheim players
SV Eintracht Trier 05 players
Bahlinger SC players
FC 08 Villingen players